Mohamed Haji Ibrahim Egal (August 15, 1928 – May 3, 2002) was a Somali politician who served as the President of Somaliland from 1993 to his death in 2002. He previously served as the first prime minister of the Somali Republic for eleven days in 1960 and again from 1967 to 1969.

Life and education
Egal was born in 1928, in Odweyne then a part of British Somaliland. He hails from the Issa Musse sub-division of the Habar Awal clan of Isaaq.

He completed his primary, intermediate, and secondary education in former British Somaliland and then moved to the United Kingdom. Egal was married to Asha Saeed Abby, and together they had three sons and two daughters.

Career

On 26 June 1960, Egal was Prime minister of the newly independent State of Somaliland, which merged five days later with the former Trust Territory of Somalia to form the Somali Republic on July 1, 1960.

Government work
He served as the first Somali's defence minister (1960–1962), Education Minister (1962–1963), Prime minister (1967–1969), and ambassador to India (1976–1978), although he was imprisoned twice under Barre dictatorship.

Prime Minister of Somali Republic
In 1967, Abdirashid Ali Shermarke was elected President and he appointed Egal as the Prime Minister.

He was still the Prime Minister and in Washington D.C. when President Abdirashid Ali Shermarke was assassinated on October 15, 1969.  Shortly afterward, the newly established Supreme Revolutionary Council (SRC) led by Major General Siad Barre, Brigadier General Mohamed Ainashe Gule, Lieutenant Colonel Salaad Gabeyre Kediye and Chief of Police Jama Korshel seized power. The SRC subsequently renamed the country the Somali Democratic Republic, arrested members of the former civilian government, banned political parties, dissolved the parliament and the Supreme Court, and suspended the constitution. Egal was among the politicians detained by the SRC for his prominent role in the nation's early government.  He was eventually released and was named the Ambassador to India (1976-1978) before the Barre regime imprisoned him again on charges of conspiracy until 1985.

President of Somaliland

Egal managed to successfully disarm and rehabilitate rebel groups, stabilised the north western region and Economy of Somaliland, successfully managed to establish bilateral trade with foreign countries, introduce Somaliland new currency the Somaliland shilling, as well as the Somaliland passport and Somaliland national flag and creating the most successful and powerful armed police and military force in Somalia.

Throughout his term as president of the Republic of Somaliland, Egal's dedication to the secessionist cause was doubted and challenged by hardliners, particularly within the Somali National Movement (SNM), who believed that he still ultimately hoped to reconcile with other political actors in the rest of Somalia. In August 2001, Egal survived by one vote a motion tabled by several regional MPs charging him of half-heartedly pursuing separatism. In an interview with IRIN the same year, SNM leader Abdirahman Awale also said of Egal that "when he says he is for independence, it is for local consumption only. He tells the people here one thing, but in his speeches elsewhere he has clearly declared that Somalia will unite one day. He says we will talk to the southerners when they make their home clean and negotiate with them... He says one thing to the public, and a different thing to the international community."

Death
Egal died on May 3, 2002 in Pretoria, South Africa while undergoing surgery at a military hospital. His body was returned to Somaliland for a state funeral, whereafter his three sons laid him to rest next to his father, in accordance with his last wishes. Around 4,000 mourners reportedly attended his burial in Berbera, and the regional parliament declared seven days of mourning. Dahir Rayale Kahin was sworn in the next day as the new president.

References

External links

 IRIN Interview with Mohamed Ibrahim Egal, President of Somaliland

|-

|-

|-

1928 births
2002 deaths
20th-century prime ministers of Somalia
21st-century presidents of Somaliland
Presidents of Somaliland
21st-century Somaliland politicians
20th-century presidents of Somaliland
United Peoples' Democratic Party politicians
British Somaliland people of World War II
Somali independence activists
Issa Musa
Prime Ministers of Somalia